Englishry or, in Old French, Englescherie, is a legal name given, in medieval England, for the status of a person as an Englishman (i.e., as a commoner of native Anglo-Saxon stock rather than a member of the Anglo-Norman elite).

Specifically, presentment of Englishry refers to the establishment that a person slain was an Englishman rather than a Norman. If an unknown man was found slain, he was presumed to be a Norman, and the administrative district known as the hundred was fined accordingly, unless it could be proved that he was English. Englishry, if established, excused the hundred.

Origins
It is thought that Danish invaders first introduced the practice in England and that the Norman conquerors preserved and revived it. W. Stubbs (Constitutional History, I p. 196) suggests such measures may have been taken by King Canute. It is not, however, mentioned in Glanvill's treatise, which is the earliest known treatise of medieval English law. There is no direct evidence of an earlier date than Bracton's 13th century legal treatise De Legibus.
Attempts to prove that a murdered Norman was English were understandably frequent.

Abolition

The practice was abolished with the Engleschrie Act of 1340 (14 Edw. III St. 1 c. 4), passed by the Parliament of England (itself repealed by the Statute Law Revision Act 1863 and the Statute Law (Ireland) Revision Act 1872).

Though for some 200 years prior to abolition, it had no longer been possible reliably to distinguish Normans from Englishmen, the practice had continued because it was so profitable to the crown, as only a small amount of the fine was allotted to the relatives of the murdered man.

See also
 Murdrum

References

Select Cases from the Coroners Rolls, 1265-1413, ed. C. Gross, Selden Society (London, 1896). Charles Gross (1896) Select Cases from the Coroner's Rolls, A.D. 1265-1413, Bernard Quaritch, London

Anglo-Saxon society
Medieval English law